War Thunder is a free-to-play vehicular combat multiplayer video game developed and published by Gaijin Entertainment. Announced in 2011, it was first released in November 2012 as an open beta with a worldwide release in January 2013; it had its official release on 21 December 2016. It has a cross-platform format for Microsoft Windows, macOS, Linux, PlayStation 4, Xbox One, PlayStation 5, Xbox Series X, Xbox Series S, Oculus, and Vive.

Developed as a "flying simulation game", it was previously named World of Planes, but due to its similarity with Wargaming's World of Warplanes, it was changed to its present name in 2012. Initially, Gaijin claimed after the game was announced that it was an April Fools joke before confirming its existence in June that same year.

War Thunder won several awards following its release, winning Best Simulation Game at the Gamescom 2013 Awards as well as winning Best Game, Best Developer, Best Technology and Best Sound at the KRI 2013 Awards. In 2019, War Thunder was among the most played games on Steam with over 25,000 concurrent players on Steam only. In 2023, the number of concurrent War Thunder players on Steam only was over 75,000 on average and peaked at 97,939 on Feb 12, 2023. These numbers do not include console players or PC players using the Gaijin.net service.

As of November 1, 2022, War Thunder had over 70 million registered players on all platforms combined, out of which 160,000 play concurrently.

Gameplay 
War Thunder is based around combined arms battles on air, land, and sea. Vehicles range from pre-World War I to modern day, with an emphasis on World War II, the Vietnam War, and the Cold War. Players can control aircraft, ground vehicles, and warships from the United States, Germany, Russia, Britain, France, and Japan, as well as nations with smaller militaries or less prominence in conflicts, such as Italy, China, Sweden and Israel. The game also incorporates smaller nations like Finland, South Africa, and Portugal.

Vehicles are divided into three main categories: aviation, ground, and fleet, while game modes are divided between arcade, realistic, and simulator. Aviation is divided between fixed-wing aircraft and helicopters, fleet is divided between "Bluewater" and "Coastal". A single-player mode that focuses on historical battles, and a co-op mode for battling AI ground vehicles and aircraft, are also available.

Events 
Events in War Thunder provide custom missions, usually based on one of the three main game modes, but with alternative settings regarding allowed vehicles, mission specifics, etc. Examples are the recreation of historical battles by restricting available vehicles (e.g., Battle of Britain).

Traditionally, the developers prepare unconventional events for April Fools' Day. It is a well-known open secret that these events are used to test planned game mechanics before their broader release to the player base.

 For 2015, a new game mode called "Unrealistic Battles" featured inflatable rubber tanks firing potatoes and carrots. The "tanks" also had overall hitpoints instead of the usual separate modules, parodying the gameplay of World of Tanks, a big competitor to War Thunder.
 For 2016, ahead of the announcement of the naval forces update, War Thunder offered playable 18th-century sailing ships fighting in the Caribbean.
 For 2017, War Thunder made playable rank IX main battle tanks and attack helicopters. Available vehicles were the Leopard 2A5, AH-64 Apache (Designated as GM-64 and operated by Germany in-game), Gepard,  T-90A, Mi-35 Hind-E and ZSU-23-4 Shilka.
 The 2018 event, named "Silent Thunder", was based underwater, with submarines.
 The 2019 event, named "Earth Thunder", took place in a fictional American city named "Green Hills" and had players use UFOs.
 In 2020, Gaijin changed the name of the game to "Space Thunder", featuring space battles.
 In 2021, Gaijin held 2 events, "Tailspin" and "Warfare 2077". Tailspin was a game mode that took place on a map called "Cape Somerset Bay" that had a cartoon art style. Players took control of new planes belonging to the "Republic of Air Pirates" faction. Warfare 2077 was a futuristic game mode that took place on the "Launch Facility" map and allowed the players to take control of futuristic tanks and unmanned aerial vehicles, teasing the September 2022 addition of drones to the game.
 In 2022, Gaijin introduced a Dune-inspired game mode called "Worm Thunder: Children of Arachis" which involved two factions fighting over cinnamon in the desert while also avoiding being eaten by a giant sandworm.

Other notable examples include "March to Victory", introducing playable mecha composed of tank parts; "The Pony Nation", introducing the world of My Little Pony as a sixth playable faction (2013); and "Gaijilla", featuring a battle against a giant Godzilla-like snail (2014).

In August 2020, the game had a tank biathlon-style event featuring select Russian and Chinese tanks performing tasks on a tank range map, with the objective to finish in 1st place after navigating obstacles and destroying targets. The event was partnered with the Information Systems Department of the Russian Ministry of Defense. Logos advertising the game also appeared during the event, notably painted on the side of the tanks during the real biathlon. The event was teased on August 17 with a YouTube video posted to the game's official YouTube Channel, as well as on the official website.

History

Early development and closed beta 
The development of the game, then under the name World of Planes, began in 2009. Gaijin Entertainment used its experience with its previous combat flight simulator games, such as IL-2 Sturmovik: Birds of Prey, Apache: Air Assault, and Birds of Steel, in the development. The title was changed to War Thunder during the closed beta due to confusion with competitor World of Warplanes.

Open beta and release 

Open beta testing started on November 1, 2012 (for users from the Russian Federation; the global beta launched January 28, 2013) for Windows PC with about 200 aircraft and 600,000 players. On May 15, 2014, at 6 million registered players, the first ground forces for Germany and the Soviet Union were introduced. Later added were the American, British, and Japanese ground forces.

In 2017, Italy was added as a playable faction. At Gamescom 2018, the planned addition of helicopters into the game was announced, and by late 2018, helicopters were fully implemented.

In 2022, Tencent announced that the Chinese version of the game published by Tencent would be discontinued on October 17.

Classified documents leaks 

On several occasions, users on the War Thunder forum have shared restricted and/or classified documents during discussions about the accuracy of the vehicles depicted. In all cases, offending posts are removed by the moderators, and users are warned against sharing such documents. Anton Yudintsev, founder of Gaijin Entertainment, has stated that the development team is never exposed to the contents, reminding users that "it’s both illegal and pointless, so they should never do that". In January 2023, Raytheon denied media reports that security clearance background checks for jobs at the defense contractor investigate whether applicants play War Thunder.

Reception 

At release, War Thunder was well-received with generally positive reviews. GameSpot praised it for its variety of airplanes and visuals, whereas IGN criticized the user interface for being "overly abundant and cumbersome" in contrast to the "sparse in-battle HUD".

See also
 Birds of Steel
 World of Tanks
 World of Warplanes
 World of Warships

References

Citations

Notes

External links

 

2013 video games
2016 video games
Fiction about aerial warfare
Combat flight simulators
Free-to-play video games
Linux games
Massively multiplayer online games
Multiplayer and single-player video games
Multiplayer online games
MacOS games
PlayStation 4 games
PlayStation 5 games
Steam Greenlight games
Tank simulation video games
Video games scored by Jeremy Soule
Video games developed in Russia
Video games set in the Caribbean
Video games set in Hawaii
Video games set in Oceania
Video games set in the Solomon Islands
Video games set in the Soviet Union
Video games set in the United States
Video games with cross-platform play
Windows games
World War II flight simulation video games
Xbox One games
Xbox Series X and Series S games
Gaijin Entertainment games